Schefflera beccariana is a species of plant in the family Araliaceae. It is found in Peninsular Malaysia and Borneo.

References

beccariana
Flora of Peninsular Malaysia
Flora of Borneo
Vulnerable plants
Taxonomy articles created by Polbot